Jordan Crane may refer to:

 Jordan Crane (cartoonist) (born 1973), American comics creator
 Jordan Crane (rugby union) (born 1986), English rugby union player
 Senator Jordan Crane, fictional Illinois senator on the AMC series Hell on Wheels